Clonsilla railway station is a railway station that serves Clonsilla, in Fingal, Ireland.

Description 
The station underwent an upgrade in 2000 that saw the platforms lengthened and a new station building being constructed.

The ticket office is open from 06:00 AM to 14:00 PM, Monday to Friday. It is closed on Saturday and Sunday.

In 2012, the station was further upgraded with a new footbridge and escalator, refurbished station building, new platform surfaces and construction of platform 3.
Platform 3 is used for a shuttle train service between Clonsilla and M3 Parkway.

The level crossing here is still a gated crossing, operated from a wheel in the signal cabin.

History
The station opened on 1 September 1848 and was closed for goods traffic on 17 June 1963. The footbridge at Clonsilla was originally located at the former railway station in Listowel, County Kerry.
All that remains of the station is a small red brick building on the bank between the tracks and the canal. This building was a waiting room. The station was opposite this but has become a private residence and has been extended and renovated.

On 2 September 2010, the original Dunboyne branch line reopened as the M3 Parkway commuter branch line. The junction is just to the west of Clonsilla station.

Services 

Clonsilla station lies on the Dublin Connolly to Maynooth and the Dublin Docklands to M3 Parkway (peak times only Monday to Friday) commuter routes.

All nonpeak time services to Hansfield, Dunboyne, and M3 Parkway are via shuttle train service from Clonsilla at platform 3 only. Travel to Dublin City at nonpeak times for a Hansfield, Dunboyne or M3 Parkway customer means to transfer to a Maynooth to Dublin Connolly service.

InterCity trains from Dublin Connolly to Sligo do not stop at Clonsilla.

Dublin Bus 39 and L51 services stop outside the station providing connections with the Blanchardstown area and Lucan.

See also 
 List of railway stations in Ireland
 Rail transport in Ireland

References

External links 

 Irish Rail Clonsilla Station Website

Iarnród Éireann stations in Fingal
Railway stations opened in 1848
Railway stations in Fingal
1848 establishments in Ireland
Railway stations in the Republic of Ireland opened in 1848